Judge Dredd: The Big Shot! is a Big Finish Productions audio drama based on the character Judge Dredd in British comic 2000 AD.

Plot
Celebrated Brit-Cit movie director Quentin Quail is traveling to Mega-City One for a gala retrospective of his work.  Judge Dredd is chagrined to be assigned as the snooty Quail's personal bodyguard for the duration of his stay, while Dredd's partner Amy Steel has to track down the assassin stalking Quail.

Cast
Toby Longworth - Judge Dredd
Claire Buckfield - Amy Steel
Regina Reagan - Enigma Smith
Peter Sowerbutts - Quentin Quail
Nicholas Briggs - Jarvis
Teresa Gallagher - Chief Judge Hershey
Kerry Skinner - Sabrina Mills

External links
Big Finish Productions

2002 audio plays
Judge Dredd